Samantha Virgo (born 20 February 1987) is a former Australian rules footballer playing for and co-captaining Gold Coast in the AFL Women's until 2021. She previously played 15 games over three seasons with Brisbane.

Early life
Virgo was born in 1987 in Blackwood, South Australia. She won the club best and fairest at Griffith-Moorooka in 2015 and was equal winner of the Queensland Women's AFL (QWAFL) best and fairest in 2016 while playing at Yeronga South Brisbane.

AFLW career

Brisbane
She was announced as one of the Brisbane Lions' "values leaders" to assist captain Emma Zielke alongside Emily Bates, Sabrina Frederick-Traub and Leah Kaslar in January 2017. She made her debut in the Lions' inaugural game against  at Casey Fields on 5 February 2017. She was nominated by her teammates for the 2017 AFLW Players' most valuable player award, and was also listed in the 2017 All-Australian team.

Brisbane signed Virgo for the 2018 season during the trade period in May 2017. She missed that season through injury, and instead acted as team manager for the Lions. She returned to playing for the 2019 season as one of three vice-captains under Kaslar.

Gold Coast
Following the 2019 season, Virgo joined the Gold Coast. She was appointed co-captain in January 2020. Virgo retired at the end of the 2021 season.

References

External links

1987 births
Living people
Sportspeople from Brisbane
Sportswomen from Queensland
Australian rules footballers from Queensland
Brisbane Lions (AFLW) players
All-Australians (AFL Women's)
Lesbian sportswomen
Australian LGBT sportspeople
LGBT players of Australian rules football
Gold Coast Football Club (AFLW) players